Acacia unguicula is a shrub of the genus Acacia and the subgenus Plurinerves. It is native to a small area in the Mid West region of Western Australia.

Description
The phyllodes are rigid and  erect, olive green and clustered towards the ends of the branches. It blooms from August to September and produces yellow flowers. Reddish-brown seed pods form later that are linear that become coiled.

Distribution
It is found on the upper slopes and summit of Mt Singleton among open scrubland, growing in rocky clay, brown clayey sand or brown loamy soils with dolerite.

Classification
The species was originally described by the botanists Richard Sumner Cowan and Bruce Maslin in 1990 as part of the work Acacia Miscellany 3. Some new microneurous taxa of Western Australia related to A. multineata (Leguminosae: Mimosoideae: Section Plurinerves) from Western Australia. published in the journal Nuytsia. Synonyms for the plant include Acacia unguiculata, Racosperma unguiculatum and Racosperma unguiculum as described by Pedley in 2003.

Conservation status
The plant was listed a critically endangered in 2006 under the  Environment Protection and Biodiversity Conservation Act 1999. The range of A. unguicula is
The small population size is a result of grazing pressure, particularly from goats.

See also
List of Acacia species

References

unguicula
Endemic flora of Southwest Australia
Acacias of Western Australia
Critically endangered flora of Australia
Taxa named by Bruce Maslin
Plants described in 1990